The 1929 Duke Blue Devils baseball team represented the Duke Blue Devils baseball team of Duke University in the 1929 NCAA baseball season. It was Jack Coombs first year coaching.

References

Duke Blue Devils
Duke Blue Devils baseball seasons
Southern Conference baseball champion seasons